Ordinary is the eighth extended play by South Korean boy group Beast. It was released on July 27, 2015 by Cube Entertainment and distributed by Universal Music Group. According to Gaon Chart, as of the end of December 2015, the album has sold a cumulative total of 87,524 copies.

This was the group's final release with Hyunseung.

Track listing

Chart performance

References

External links 
 Album website
 
 
 

Cube Entertainment EPs
2015 EPs
Highlight (band) EPs
Korean-language EPs